The Duneland Athletic Conference (DAC) is a high school athletic conference in Indiana serving eight members of the Indiana High School Athletic Association.  Member schools are located in the counties of Lake, LaPorte, and Porter along Indiana's Lake Michigan shore. Each school is classified based on enrollment as 6A or 5A for football and 4A for basketball, the classes for the largest schools in Indiana. The Duneland Conference is also known for its gymnastics programs which have won a combined total of 35 state championship and state runner-up titles.

Members

Current members

Former Members

Membership Timeline

Sponsored Sports & Current Standings

History
 1970: Chesterton, Portage, Valparaiso, and Hobart High School began competition as the Duneland Athletic Conference. Chesterton & Portage had been members of the Calumet Conference; Hobart & Valparaiso had been independents.
 1972: Michigan City Rogers joins the DAC.
 1975: Merrillville joins the conference, leaving the Lake Suburban Conference.
 1976: LaPorte joins following its departure from the Northern Indiana Conference.
 1993: Crown Point joins the DAC following the disbandment of the Lake Suburban Conference.
 1995: Michigan City Rogers is merged with Michigan City Elston, who was a member of the Northern Indiana Conference, to form Michigan City High School.
 2003: Hobart, the only non-5A football school, leaves to join the Lake Athletic Conference. Lake Central joins in place of Hobart following being independent since the disbandment of the Lake Suburban Conference in 1993. Hobart is currently with the Northwest Crossroads Conference after the 2007 disbandment of the Lake Athletic Conference.
2013: Football has a new class, 6A, meaning that the teams to move from 5A to 6A are Portage, Lake Central, Chesterton, Crown Point, Valparaiso, & Merrillville. The only teams to remain in the 5A class were LaPorte and Michigan City.
 2015: LaPorte moves up to Class 6A in football based on enrollment figures.
 2017: LaPorte drops back down to Class 5A in football based on enrollment figures and Fort Wayne Snider having to move up to Class 6A based on the Indiana High School Athletic Association's tournament success factor.

2003 Expansion
In 2002, five schools - East Chicago Central High School, Elkhart Central High School, Lake Central High School, Mishawaka High School, & Penn High School - submitted proposals to join the DAC when expansion talks began following Hobart's announcement it would leave to join the Lake Athletic Conference. Lake Central, Mishawaka and Penn were invited to join the DAC. Mishawaka, shortly followed by Penn, opted to not join the conference. These two schools cited wanting Elkhart Central and East Chicago Central to have been invited to join as well. This coupled with the extensive travel times to Lake County schools and the time zone difference led to their decision to remain in the Northern Indiana Conference.

Conference Champions

Football

Boys Basketball

Girls Basketball 

Champions before the 2000–01 season are unverified.

State Champions

Chesterton Trojans (13)
 1989 Wrestling
 1993 Gymnastics
 2000 Gymnastics
 2002 Gymnastics
 2008 Boys Swimming
 2009 Boys Swimming
 2013 Boys Swimming
 2014 Boys Swimming
 2018 Gymnastics
 2018 Boys Soccer
 2019 Gymnastics
 2020 Boys Soccer
 2020 Gymnastics

Crown Point Bulldogs (11)
 1971 Boys Tennis
 1984 Girls Basketball
 1985 Girls Basketball
 2009 Boys Wrestling
 2011 Boys Soccer (2A)
 2013 Boys Soccer (2A)
 2017 Softball (4A)
 2021 Girls Basketball (4A)
 2022 Gymnastics
 2022 Boys Wrestling
 2023 Boys Wrestling

LaPorte Slicers (12)
 1960 Boys Golf
 1967 Baseball
 1968 Boys Tennis
 1971 Baseball
 1976 Baseball
 1976 Boys Golf
 1978 Girls Golf
 1982 Baseball
 1987 Baseball (Easton National Champions)
 1990 Baseball
 1992 Baseball
 2000 Baseball (4A)

Lake Central Indians (7)
 1987 Boys Swimming
 1992 Softball
 1994 Girls Basketball
 2002 Softball (3A)
 2004 Softball (4A)
 2010 Boys Soccer
 2012 Baseball (4A)

Merrillville Pirates (6)
 1976 Football (3A)
 1986 Gymnastics
 1992 Gymnastics
 1993 Softball
 1997 Softball
 2017 Unified Track & Field

Michigan City Wolves (1)
 1995 Volleyball

Portage Indians (9)
 1974 Boys Cross Country
 1975 Gymnastics
 1977 Football (3A)
 1984 Boys Cross Country
 1992 Boys Cross Country
 1999 Boys Cross Country
 2000 Softball (3A)
 2013 Gymnastics
 2013 Softball (4A)

Valparaiso Vikings (29)
 1966 Boys Cross Country
 1975 Football (3A)
 1981 Gymnastics
 1983 Boys Cross Country
 1985 Boys Cross Country
 1986 Boys Cross Country
 1991 Gymnastics
 1994 Gymnastics
 1997 Boys Cross Country
 1997 Gymnastics
 1998 Gymnastics
 1999 Girls Cross Country
 2000 Girls Cross Country
 2000 Boys Cross Country
 2002 Girls Cross Country
 2003 Girls Cross Country
 2004 Girls Cross Country
 2004 Boys Soccer
 2008 Gymnastics
 2009 Gymnastics
 2010 Gymnastics
 2011 Gymnastics
 2014 Gymnastics
 2015 Gymnastics
 2017 Gymnastics
 2019 Unified Track & Field
 2021 Unified Track & Field
 2021 Gymnastics
 2022 Football (5A)

Former Member State Champions

Hobart Brickies (7)
 1957 Boys Cross Country
 1960 Boys Cross Country
 1987 Football (4A)
 1989 Football (4A)
 1991 Football (4A)
 1993 Football (4A)
 2004 Gymnastics

Michigan City Rogers Raiders (2)
 1981 Girls Golf
 1982 Girls Golf

State Runner-Up Titles

Current members
Chesterton Trojans (12)
 1981 Wrestling
 1985 Gymnastics
 1995 Gymnastics
 1995 Girls Cross Country
 1997 Girls Cross Country
 2001 Girls Soccer
 2003 Gymnastics
 2003 Girls Cross Country
 2006 Girls Softball
 2007 Boys Soccer
 2009 Boys Cross Country
 2016 Boys Soccer (2A)
 2017 Wrestling

Crown Point Bulldogs (10)
 1975 Boys Cross Country
 1976 Boys Cross Country
 1977 Boys Cross Country
 1983 Girls Basketball
 1978 Boys Swimming
 1997 Girls Basketball
 2012 Wrestling
 2014 Girls Swimming
 2016 Volleyball (4A)
 2017 Volleyball (4A)

LaPorte Slicers (10)
 1949 Boys Golf
 1962 Boys Golf
 1963 Boys Golf
 1967 Boys Golf
 1973 Baseball
 1973 Gymnastics
 1979 Boys Tennis
 1980 Girls Golf
 1989 Boys Tennis
 2007 Boys Cross Country
 2014 Football (5A)

Lake Central Indians (12)
 1990 Boys Swimming
 1998 Girls Basketball (4A)
 1999 Boys Swimming
 1993 Football (5A)
 2003 Softball (3A)
 2007 Girls Cross Country
 2008 Girls Cross Country
 2014 Boys Basketball (4A)
 2015 Softball (4A)
 2018 Softball (4A)
 2019 Boys Soccer (3A)
 2021 Softball (4A)

Merrillville Pirates (7)
 1979 Gymnastics
 1982 Gymnastics
 1988 Gymnastics
 1990 Gymnastics
 1995 Boys Basketball
 1996 Baseball
 2010 Girls Basketball

Michigan City Wolves (0)
 2016 Boys Track and Field

Portage Indians (12)
 1973 Boys Cross Country
 1981 Boys Cross Country
 1988 Boys Cross Country
 1988 Girls Cross Country
 1991 Boys Cross Country
 1993 Boys Cross Country
 1994 Football (5A)
 1995 Boys Cross Country
 1998 Softball (3A)
 1998 Boys Cross Country
 1998 Wrestling
 2001 Wrestling

Valparaiso Vikings (24)
 1982 Girls Basketball
 1985 Football (5A)
 1989 Girls Swimming
 1990 Girls Swimming
 1992 Gymnastics
 1994 Girls Swimming
 1995 Girls Swimming
 1994 Boys Basketball
 1996 Girls Basketball
 1996 Gymnastics
 1999 Gymnastics
 2000 Girls Basketball (4A)
 2001 Girls Cross Country
 2001 Football (5A)
 2004 Gymnastics
 2005 Boys Cross Country
 2005 Girls Cross Country
 2006 Girls Track & Field
 2006 Girls Cross Country
 2013 Gymnastics
 2016 Gymnastics
 2018 Gymnastics
 2019 Football (5A)
 2020 Gymnastics

Former members
Hobart Brickies (8)
 1955 Boys Cross Country
 1979 Football (3A)
 1980 Football (4A)
 1982 Football (4A)
 1984 Football (4A)
 1985 Football (4A)
 1990 Football (4A)
 1996 Football (4A)

Michigan City Rogers Raiders (1)
 1986 Softball

See also
 Hoosier Hysteria
 Largest high school gyms in the United States

Related links
 Northern Indiana Football History
 Indiana High School Athletic Association

References

Indiana high school athletic conferences
1970 establishments in Indiana